Anthony Atkinson  was an Irish politician.

Atkinson was born in 1681 at Roscrea and educated at Trinity College, Dublin. A barrister, he was an MP in the Irish House of Commons for St Johnstown from 1711 to 1713, and for Belfast from 1713 to 1715. He died in 1743.

References

People from County Tipperary
1680 births
Irish barristers
Irish MPs 1703–1713
Alumni of Trinity College Dublin
Members of the Parliament of Ireland (pre-1801) for County Tipperary constituencies
1743 deaths